Rivers Inlet Water Aerodrome  is located adjacent to Rivers Inlet, British Columbia, Canada.

References

Seaplane bases in British Columbia
Central Coast Regional District
Registered aerodromes in British Columbia